Betta C. Edu (born October 27,1986) is a Nigerian politician. She is a Fellow of the Royal Society for Public Health and currently the Cross River State Commissioner for Health and National Chairman of the Nigeria Health Commissioners Forum.

Edu is a member of the Presidential Health Reform Committee and the All progressives congress (APC) Reconciliation Committee.

Career 
In 2015 Edu was appointed as the special adviser to Governor Benedict Ayade on community and primary health care the youngest in the country. In May 2016, she was appointed pioneer DG of Cross River State Primary Health Care Agency until 2019, when she was appointed Cross River State Commissioner for Health.

In 2020, Betta Edu was chairman of the Cross River State COVID-19 Taskforce. She coordinated the Cross River State COVID-19 Response, and established and coordinated the Emergency Operations Centre for COVID-19 in the state. In August 2020, she emerged as the National Chairman of the Nigeria Health Commissioners Forum.

Betta Edu, As a philanthropist she has support education of some less privileged in her community.

Betta Edu emerged as the youngest national woman leader of the All Progressives Congress (APC) in March 2022 after defeating her opponent by 2,662 to 117 votes at the APC National convention

Awards 
Quintessential Nigeria Woman Award: Excellent Women International (2020)  
Medical Expert of the Year (2020)

Controversies 
In 2022, Dr Betta Edu contested to be National Women leader for her party. During her campaign, Dr Betta Edu, faced disqualification in the contest for the national women leader position of the All Progressives Congress (APC) due to Section 84(12) of the new Nigerian Electoral Act.

Section 84(12) states that: “No political appointee at any level shall be a voting delegate or be voted for at the convention or congress of any political party for the purpose of the nomination of candidates for any election. At the time she was contesting, Dr. Edu claimed to have resigned her office as the Commissioner for Health in Cross River state of Nigeria.  

During COVID in 2020,  Dr Betta Edu, as Commissioner for Health, Cross River State was accused of posting fake photos of ventilators. 
The Cross River state chapter of the Nigerian Medical Association also withdrew its services in hospitals across the state and passed a vote of no confidence on the state Commissioner for Health, Dr Betta Edu, over the alleged unethical handling of COVID-19 crisis. 

Dr Edu claims the vote of no confidence was political.

References 

1986 births
Nigerian women medical doctors
People from Cross River State
21st-century Nigerian women politicians
21st-century Nigerian politicians
Living people